Noinville is a Canadian unincorporated community, located in Kent County, New Brunswick. The community is situated in southeastern New Brunswick, close to Rogersville. Noinville is located mainly on New Brunswick Route 126.

History

Notable people

See also
List of communities in New Brunswick

References

Bordering communities

Acadie Siding, New Brunswick
Kent Junction, New Brunswick

Communities in Kent County, New Brunswick